Thomas Drake may refer to:

Thomas J. Drake (1797–1875), American politician from Michigan
Tom Drake (baseball) (1912–1988), American baseball pitcher
Thomas A. Drake (born 1957), NSA whistleblower
Thomas Y. Drake (1936–2008), Canadian folk singer

See also
Tom Drake (1918–1982), American actor born Alfred Sinclair Alderdice
Tom Drake (wrestler) (1930–2017), American former professional wrestler, attorney, and politician
Tom Drake-Brockman (1919–1992), Australian politician
Sir Thomas Trayton Fuller-Eliott-Drake, 1st Baronet, British Army officer